Rokewood  is a small rural township in Victoria, Australia in the Golden Plains Shire,  west of the state capital, Melbourne.

History
Rokewood Post Office opened on 1 October 1857.

McMillans Bridge, which crosses the Woady Yaloak River for the Rokewood-Skipton Road between Rokewood and Werneth, is listed on the Victorian Heritage Register.

Attractions
Rokewood Swimming Lagoon is an unusual community-run public waterhole in the centre of Rokewood. It is open from December to March each year.

Sport
In conjunction with its neighbouring township Corindhap Rokewood has an Australian Rules football and netball team, Rokewood-Corindhap. It previously competed in the Lexton Plains Football League, but the league folded at the end of the 2010 season. The team now play in the Central Highlands Football League  

Golfers play at the course of the Rokewood Golf Club on Rokewood - Shelford Road.

References

Towns in Victoria (Australia)
Golden Plains Shire
1857 establishments in Australia